Ancillista is a genus of sea snails, marine gastropod mollusks in the family Ancillariidae.

Species
Species within the genus Ancillista include:

 Ancillista albicans Lee & Wu, 1997
 Ancillista aureocallosa Kilburn & Jenner, 1977
 Ancillista cingulata (G.B. Sowerby I, 1830)
 Ancillista depontesi Kilburn, 1998
 Ancillista fernandesi Kilburn & Jenner, 1977
 Ancillista hasta (von Martens, 1902)
 Ancillista muscae (Pilsbry, 1926)
 Ancillista ngampitchae Gra-Tes, 2002
 Ancillista rosadoi Bozetti & Terzer, 2004
 Ancillista velesiana Iredale, 1936

References

External links

Ancillariidae